The 2014 San Diego Padres season was their 46th season in Major League Baseball (MLB), and their 10th at Petco Park. After finishing with a 76-86 record in 2013, they only managed to improve by just one game in 2014, finishing the season with a 77–85 record. After winning the season opener and starting the season 1–1, the Padres stayed under .500 for the rest of the season.

San Diego entered the season with the highest payroll in franchise history, yet still ranked in the bottom third in MLB. They finished the season with its best home record (48–33) since the opening of Petco in 2004. They tied their World Series team of 1984 with 48 home wins, which had only been exceeded by its 1978 team and their pennant-winning 1998 squad.

Season standings

National League West

National League Wild Card

Game log 

|-  style="text-align:center; bgcolor="bbffbb"
| 1 || March 30 || Dodgers || 3–1 || Thayer (1–0) || Wilson (0–1) || Street (1) || 45,567 || 1–0 || Box
|- style="text-align:center; bgcolor="ffbbbb"
| 2 || April 1 || Dodgers || 2–3 || Greinke (1–0) || Kennedy (0–1) || Jansen (2) || 35,033 || 1–1 || Box
|- style="text-align:center; bgcolor="ffbbbb"
| 3 || April 2 || Dodgers || 1–5 || Haren (1–0) || Ross (0–1) ||  || 27,498 || 1–2 || Box
|- style="text-align:center; bgcolor="ffbbbb"
| 4 || April 4 || @ Marlins || 2–8 || Koehler (1–0) || Stults (0–1) || Hand (1) || 17,783 || 1–3 || Box
|- style="text-align:center; bgcolor="ffbbbb"
| 5 || April 5 || @ Marlins || 0–5 || Fernández (2–0) || Cashner (0–1) ||  || 35,188 || 1–4 || Box
|- style="text-align:center; bgcolor="bbffbb"
| 6 || April 6 || @ Marlins || 4–2 ||  Kennedy (1–1) || Eovaldi (1–1) || Street (2) || 22,496 || 2–4 || Box
|- style="text-align:center; bgcolor="bbbbbb"
|  || April 7 || @ Indians ||colspan="7" | Postponed (rain) to April 9 as part of a doubleheader
|- style="text-align:center; bgcolor="ffbbbb"
| 7 || April 8 || @ Indians || 6–8 || Kluber (1–1) || Ross (0–2) || Axford (3) || 9,029 || 2–5 || Box
|- style="text-align:center; bgcolor="ffbbbb"
| 8 || April 9 || @ Indians || 0–2 || McAllister (1–0) || Stults (0–2) || Axford (4) ||  || 2–6 || Box
|- style="text-align:center; bgcolor="bbffbb"
| 9 || April 9 || @ Indians || 2–1 || Erlin (1–0) || Bauer (0–1) || Street (3) || 9,930 || 3–6 || Box
|- style="text-align:center; bgcolor="bbffbb"
| 10 || April 11 || Tigers || 6–0 || Cashner (1–1) || Porcello (1–1) ||  || 30,353 || 4–6 || Box
|- style="text-align:center; bgcolor="ffbbbb"
| 11 || April 12 || Tigers || 6–2 || Verlander (1–1) || Kennedy (1–2) ||  || 42,182 || 4–7 || Box
|- style="text-align:center; bgcolor="bbffbb"
| 12 || April 13 || Tigers || 5–1 || Ross (1–2) || Scherzer (0–1) ||  || 32,267 || 5–7 || Box
|- style="text-align:center; bgcolor="bbffbb"
| 13 || April 14 || Rockies || 5–4 || Thayer (2–0) || Brothers (1–2) || Street (4) || 14,784 || 6–7 || Box
|- style="text-align:center; bgcolor="ffbbbb"
| 14 || April 15 || Rockies || 3–2 || Nicasio (2–0) || Erlin (1–1) || Hawkins (3) || 18,012 || 6–8 || Box
|- style="text-align:center; bgcolor="bbffbb"
| 15 || April 16 || Rockies || 4–2 || Cashner (2–1) || De la Rosa (0–3) || Street (5) || 17,428 || 7–8 || Box
|- style="text-align:center; bgcolor="ffbbbb"
| 16 || April 17 || Rockies || 1–3 || Morales (1–1) || Kennedy (1–3) || Hawkins (4) || 17,557 || 7–9 || Box
|- style="text-align:center; bgcolor="bbffbb"
| 17 || April 18 || Giants || 2–1 || Ross (2–2) || Cain (0–3) || Street (6) || 34,839 || 8–9 || Box
|- style="text-align:center; bgcolor="bbffbb"
| 18 || April 19 || Giants || 3–1 || Stults (1–2) || Hudson (2–1) || Benoit (1) || 43,405 || 9–9 || Box
|- style="text-align:center; bgcolor="ffbbbb"
| 19 || April 20 || Giants || 4–3 || Lincecum (1–1) || Erlin (1–2) ||  || 25,035 || 9–10 || Box
|- style="text-align:center; bgcolor="ffbbbb"
| 20 || April 21 || @ Brewers || 3–4 || Peralta (3–0) || Cashner (2–2) || Rodríguez (8) || 25,408 || 9–11 || Box
|- style="text-align:center; bgcolor="bbffbb"
| 21 || April 22 || @ Brewers || 2–1 || Roach (1–0) || Fígaro (0–1) || Street (7) || 25,815 || 10–11 || Box
|- style="text-align:center; bgcolor="ffbbbb"
| 22 || April 23 || @ Brewers || 2–5 || Lohse (4–1) || Ross (2–3) || Rodríguez (9) || 28,095 || 10–12 || Box
|- style="text-align:center; bgcolor="bbffbb"
| 23 || April 24 || @ Nationals || 4–3 || Torres (1–0) || Stammen (0–1) || Street (8) || 22,904 || 11–12 || Box
|- style="text-align:center; bgcolor="ffbbbb"
| 24 || April 25 || @ Nationals || 1–11 || Strasburg (2–2) || Erlin (1–3) ||  || 25,497 || 11–13 || Box
|- style="text-align:center; bgcolor="ffbbbb"
| 25 || April 26 || @ Nationals || 0–4 || Roark (2–0) || Cashner (2–3) ||  || 31,590 || 11–14 || Box
|- style="text-align:center; bgcolor="bbffbb"
| 26 || April 27 || @ Nationals || 2–4 || Kennedy (2–3) || Detwiler (0–1) || Street (9) || 34,873 || 12–14 || Box
|- style="text-align:center; bgcolor="bbffbb"
| 27 || April 28 || @ Giants || 4–6 || Ross (3–3) || Bumgarner (2–3) || Street (10) || 41,533 || 13–14 || Box
|- style="text-align:center; bgcolor="ffbbbb"
| 28 || April 29 || @ Giants || 0–6 || Petit (2–1) || Stults (1–3) ||  || 41,952 || 13–15 || Box
|- style="text-align:center; bgcolor="ffbbbb"
| 29 || April 30 || @ Giants || 2–3 || Hudson (4–1) || Erlin (1–4) || Romo (7) || 42,164 || 13–16 || Box
|-

|- style="text-align:center; bgcolor="ffbbbb"
| 30 || May 2 || Diamondbacks || 0–2 || Arroyo (2–2) || Cashner (2–4) || Reed (7) || 27,032 || 13–17 || Box
|- style="text-align:center; bgcolor="ffbbbb"
| 31 || May 3 || Diamondbacks || 3–4 || McCarthy (1–5) || Kennedy (2–4) || Reed (8) || 35,213 || 13–18 || Box
|- style="text-align:center; bgcolor="bbffbb"
| 32 || May 4 || Diamondbacks || 4–3 || Street (1–0) || Pérez (0–1) ||  || 32,657 || 14–18 || Box
|- style="text-align:center; bgcolor="bbffbb"
| 33 || May 5 || Royals || 6–5 (12) || Stauffer (1–0) || Collins (0–2) ||  || 14,089 || 15–18 || Box
|- style="text-align:center; bgcolor="ffbbbb"
| 34 || May 6 || Royals || 1–3 || Davis (2–1) || Vincent (0–1) || Holland (8) || 16,542 || 15–19 || Box
|- style="text-align:center; bgcolor="ffbbbb"
| 35 || May 7 || Royals || 0–8 || Shields (4–3) || Cashner (2–5) ||  || 18,228 || 15–20 || Box
|- style="text-align:center; bgcolor="ffbbbb"
| 36 || May 8 || Marlins || 1–3 (11) || Ramos (3–0) || Thayer (2–1) || Cishek (7) || 17,832 || 15–21 || Box
|- style="text-align:center; bgcolor="bbffbb"
| 37 || May 9 || Marlins || 10–1 || Ross (4–3) || Fernández (4–2) ||  || 22,553 || 16–21 || Box
|- style="text-align:center; bgcolor="bbffbb"
| 38 || May 10 || Marlins || 9–3 || Stults (2–3) || Mármol (0–3) ||  || 27,719 || 17–21 || Box
|- style="text-align:center; bgcolor="bbffbb"
| 39 || May 11 || Marlins || 5–4 || Erlin (2–4) || Álvarez (2–3) || Street (11) || 17,682 || 18–21 || Box
|- style="text-align:center; bgcolor="bbffbb"
| 40 || May 13 || @ Reds || 2–1 || Benoit (1–0) || Chapman (0–1) || Street (12) || 23,269 || 19–21 || Box
|- style="text-align:center; bgcolor="bbbbbb"
| -- || May 14 || @ Reds ||colspan=7| Postponed (rain); rescheduled for May 15 as part of a day-night doubleheader
|- style="text-align:center; bgcolor="ffbbbb"
| 41 || May 15 || @ Reds || 0–5 || Cueto (3–2) || Kennedy (2–5) || || 27,686 || 19–22 || Box 
|- style="text-align:center; bgcolor="bbffbb"
| 42 || May 15 || @ Reds || 6–1 || Ross (5–3) || Francis (0–1) || || 23,544 || 20–22 || Box
|- style="text-align:center; bgcolor="ffbbbb"
| 43 || May 16 || @ Rockies || 1–3 || De la Rosa (5–3) || Stults (2–4) || Hawkins (10) || 35,384 || 20–23 || Box
|- style="text-align:center; bgcolor="bbffbb"
| 44 || May 17 || @ Rockies || 8–5 || Erlin (3–4) || Lyles (5–1) || Street (13) || 40,508 || 21–23 || Box
|- style="text-align:center; bgcolor="ffbbbb"
| 45 || May 18 || @ Rockies || 6–8 || Masset (1–0) || Thayer (2–2) ||  || 44,092 || 21–24 || Box
|- style="text-align:center; bgcolor="ffbbbb"
| 46 || May 20 || Twins || 3–5 || Correia (2–5) || Kennedy (2–6) || Perkins (13) || 19,136 || 21–25 || Box
|- style="text-align:center; bgcolor="ffbbbb"
| 47 || May 21 || Twins || 0–2 || Hughes (5–1) || Ross (5–4) || Perkins (14) || 16,079 || 21–26 || Box
|- style="text-align:center; bgcolor="ffbbbb"
| 48 || May 22 || Cubs || 1–5 || Arrieta (1–0) || Stults (2–5) || Villanueva (1) || 21,263 || 21–27 || Box
|- style="text-align:center; bgcolor="bbffbb"
| 49 || May 23 || Cubs || 11–1 || Stauffer (2–0) || Jackson (3–4) ||  || 26,489 || 22–27 || Box
|- style="text-align:center; bgcolor="ffbbbb"
| 50 || May 24 || Cubs || 2–3 || Wood (5–4) || Buckner (0–1) || Rondón (6) || 42,107 || 22–28 || Box
|- style="text-align:center; bgcolor="bbffbb"
| 51 || May 25 || Cubs || 4–3 || Kennedy (3–6) || Hammel (5–3) || Street (14) || 32,167 || 23–28 || Box
|- style="text-align:center; bgcolor="ffbbbb"
| 52 || May 26 || @ Diamondbacks || 5–7 || Ziegler (1–1) || Quackenbush (0–1) ||  || 35,580 || 23–29 || Box
|- style="text-align:center; bgcolor="bbffbb"
| 53 || May 27 || @ Diamondbacks || 4–3 || Quackenbush (1–1) || Marshall (2–1) || Street (15) || 17,862 || 24–29 || Box
|- style="text-align:center; bgcolor="ffbbbb"
| 54 || May 28 || @ Diamondbacks || 6–12 || Anderson (3–0) || Stauffer (2–1) ||  || 22,233 || 24–30 || Box
|- style="text-align:center; bgcolor="bbffbb"
| 55 || May 30 || @ White Sox || 4–1 || Kennedy (4–6) || Danks (3–5) || Street (16) || 25,342 || 25–30 || Box
|- style="text-align:center; bgcolor="bbffbb"
| 56 || May 31 || @ White Sox || 4–2 || Ross (6–4) || Rienzo (4–2) || Street (17) || 19,025 || 26–30 || Box
|-

|- style="text-align:center; bgcolor="ffbbbb"
| 57 || June 1 || @ White Sox || 1–4 || Sale (5–0) || Stults (2–6) ||  || 23,185 || 26–31 || Box
|- style="text-align:center; bgcolor="ffbbbb"
| 58 || June 2 || Pirates || 3–10 || Morton (2–7) || Stauffer (2–2) ||  || 18,876 || 26–32 || Box
|- style="text-align:center; bgcolor="ffbbbb"
| 59 || June 3 || Pirates || 1–4 || Cole (6–3) || Hahn (0–1) || Grilli (9) || 20,520 || 26–33 || Box
|- style="text-align:center; bgcolor="bbffbb"
| 60 || June 4 || Pirates || 3–2 || Kennedy (5–6) || Liriano (1–6) || Street (18) || 17,923 || 27–33 || Box
|- style="text-align:center; bgcolor="ffbbbb"
| 61 || June 6 || Nationals || 0–6 || Roark (4–4) || Ross (6–5) ||  || 25,346 || 27–34 || Box
|- style="text-align:center; bgcolor="bbffbb"
| 62 || June 7 || Nationals || 4–3 (11) || Benoit (2–0) || Stammen (0–2) ||  || 29,172 || 28–34 || Box
|- style="text-align:center; bgcolor="ffbbbb"
| 63 || June 8 || Nationals || 6–0 || Zimmermann (5–2) || Stults (2–7) ||  || 27,046 || 28–35 || Box
|- style="text-align:center; bgcolor="ffbbbb"
| 64 || June 10 || @ Phillies || 2–5 || Burnett (4–5) || Kennedy (5–7) || Papelbon (14) || 31,037 || 28–36 || Box 
|- style="text-align:center; bgcolor="ffbbbb"
| 65 || June 11 || @ Phillies || 3–0 || Papelbon (2–1) || Vincent (0–2) ||  || 25,398 || 28–37 || Box
|- style="text-align:center; bgcolor="ffbbbb"
| 66 || June 12 || @ Phillies || 3–7 || Kendrick (2–6) || Stults (2–8) ||  || 29,372 || 28–38 || Box
|- style="text-align:center; bgcolor="ffbbbb"
| 67 || June 13 || @ Mets || 2–6 || Colón (6–5) || Cashner (2–6) ||  || 28,085 || 28–39 || Box
|- style="text-align:center; bgcolor="bbffbb"
| 68 || June 14 || @ Mets || 5–0 || Hahn (1–1) || Wheeler (2–7) ||  || 38,267 || 29–39 || Box
|- style="text-align:center; bgcolor="ffbbbb"
| 69 || June 15 || @ Mets || 1–3 || Torres (3–4) || Kennedy (5–8) || Mejía (7) || 38,987 || 29–40 || Box
|- style="text-align:center; bgcolor="ffbbbb"
| 70 || June 16 || @ Mariners || 1–5 || Young (6–4) || Ross (6–6) ||  || 17,512 || 29–41 || Box
|- style="text-align:center; bgcolor="ffbbbb"
| 71 || June 17 || @ Mariners || 1–6 || Elías (6–5) || Stults (2–9) ||  || 19,896 || 29–42 || Box
|- style="text-align:center; bgcolor="bbffbb"
| 72 || June 18 || Mariners || 2–1 || Benoit (3–0) || Furbush (0–4) || Street (19) || 27,523 || 30–42 || Box
|- style="text-align:center; bgcolor="bbffbb"
| 73 || June 19 || Mariners || 4–1 || Hahn (2–1) || Leone (2–1) || Street (20) || 18,755 || 31–42 || Box
|- style="text-align:center; bgcolor="bbffbb"
| 74 || June 20 || Dodgers || 6–5 || Thayer (3–2) || Jansen (0–3) ||  || 31,119 || 32–42 || Box
|- style="text-align:center; bgcolor="ffbbbb"
| 75 || June 21 || Dodgers || 2–4 || Beckett (5–4) || Ross (6–7) || Jansen (21) || 43,474 || 32–43 || Box
|- style="text-align:center; bgcolor="ffbbbb"
| 76 || June 22 || Dodgers || 1–2 || Ryu (9–3) || Stults (2–10) || Jansen (22) || 32,406 || 32–44 || Box
|- style="text-align:center; bgcolor="bbffbb"
| 77 || June 23 || @ Giants || 6–0 || Despaigne (1–0) || Cain (1–6) ||  || 41,360 || 33–44 || Box
|- style="text-align:center; bgcolor="bbffbb"
| 78 || June 24 || @ Giants || 7–2 || Hahn (3–1) || Hudson (7–4) ||  || 41,546 || 34–44 || Box
|- style="text-align:center; bgcolor="ffbbbb"
| 79 || June 25 || @ Giants || 0–4 || Lincecum (6–5) || Kennedy (5–9) ||  || 41,500 || 34–45 || Box
|- style="text-align:center; bgcolor="ffbbbb"
| 80 || June 27 || Diamondbacks || 1–2 || McCarthy (2–10) ||  Ross (6–8) || Reed (18) || 25,897 || 34–46 || Box
|- style="text-align:center; bgcolor="ffbbbb"
| 81 || June 28 || Diamondbacks || 1–3 || Collmenter (7–4) || Stults (2–11) || Reed (19) || 31,527 || 34–47 || Box
|- style="text-align:center; bgcolor="bbffbb"
| 82 || June 29 || Diamondbacks || 2–1 || Despaigne (2–0) || Bolsinger (1–4) || Street (21) || 20,267 || 35–47 || Box
|- style="text-align:center; bgcolor="bbffbb"
| 83 || June 30 || Reds || 1–0 || Hahn (4–1) || Latos (1–1) || Street (22) || 19,079 || 36–47 || Box
|-

|- style="text-align:center; bgcolor="bbffbb"
| 84 || July 1 || Reds || 8–2 || Kennedy (6–9) || Leake (6–7) ||  || 20,312 || 37–47 || Box
|- style="text-align:center; bgcolor="bbffbb"
| 85 || July 2 || Reds || 3–0 || Ross (7–8) || Cueto (8–6) ||  || 19,250 || 38–47 || Box
|- style="text-align:center; bgcolor="bbffbb"
| 86 || July 4 || Giants || 2–0 || Stults (3–11) || Cain (1–7) || Street (23) || 31,126 || 39–47 || Box
|- style="text-align:center; bgcolor="ffbbbb"
| 87 || July 5 || Giants || 3–5 || Romo (4–3) || Thayer (3–3) || Casilla (2) || 36,127 || 39–48 || Box
|- style="text-align:center; bgcolor="ffbbbb"
| 88 || July 6 || Giants || 5–3 || Lincecum (8–5) || Hahn (4–2) || Casilla (3) || 28,065 || 39–49 || Box
|- style="text-align:center; bgcolor="bbffbb"
| 89 || July 7 || @ Rockies || 6–1 || Kennedy (7–9) || Matzek (1–3) ||  || 26,782 || 40–49 || Box
|- style="text-align:center; bgcolor="ffbbbb"
| 90 || July 8 || @ Rockies || 1–2 || Morales (5–4) || Ross (7–9) || Hawkins (16) || 27,601 || 40–50 || Box
|- style="text-align:center; bgcolor="ffbbbb"
| 91 || July 9 || @ Rockies || 3–6 || Logan (2–1) || Benoit (3–1) || Hawkins (17) || 26,212 || 40–51 || Box
|- style="text-align:center; bgcolor="ffbbbb"
| 92 || July 10 || @ Dodgers || 1–2 || Kershaw (11–2) || Despaigne (2–1) ||  || 50,332 || 40–52 || Box
|- style="text-align:center; bgcolor="bbffbb"
| 93 || July 11 || @ Dodgers || 6–3 || Hahn (5–2) || Haren (8–6) || Street (24) || 46,073 || 41–52 || Box
|- style="text-align:center; bgcolor="ffbbbb"
| 94 || July 12 || @ Dodgers || 0–1 || Jansen (1–3) || Quackenbush (1–2) ||  || 51,794 || 41–53 || Box
|- style="text-align:center; bgcolor="ffbbbb"
| 95 || July 13 || @ Dodgers || 0–1 || Ryu (10–5) || Ross (7–10) || Jansen (27) || 47,131 || 41–54 || Box
|- style="text-align:center; bgcolor="bbcaff"
|colspan="10" | All-Star Break in Minneapolis, Minnesota
|- style="text-align:center; bgcolor="ffbbbb"
| 96 || July 18 || Mets || 4–5 || Familia (2–3) || Benoit (3–2) || Mejía (11) || 27,374 || 41–55 || Box
|- style="text-align:center; bgcolor="bbffbb"
| 97 || July 19 || Mets || 6–0 || Ross (8–10) || Gee (4–2) ||  || 42,702 || 42–55 || Box
|- style="text-align:center; bgcolor="bbffbb"
| 98 || July 20 || Mets || 2–1 || Benoit (4–2) || Black (2–3) ||  || 31,513 || 43–55 || Box
|- style="text-align:center; bgcolor="ffbbbb"
| 99 || July 22 || @ Cubs || 0–6 || Hendricks (1–0) || Stults (3–12) ||  || 32,730 || 43–56 || Box
|- style="text-align:center; bgcolor="bbffbb"
| 100 || July 23 || @ Cubs || 8–3 || Kennedy (8–9) || Wada (0–1) ||   || 30,718 || 44–56 || Box
|- style="text-align:center; bgcolor="bbffbb"
| 101 || July 24 || @ Cubs || 13–3 || Ross (9–10) || Jackson (5–11) ||  || 31,321 || 45–56 || Box
|- style="text-align:center; bgcolor="bbffbb"
| 102 || July 25 || @ Braves || 5–2 || Hahn (6–2) || Wood (7–8) || Benoit (2) || 31,647 || 46–56 || Box
|- style="text-align:center; bgcolor="ffbbbb"
| 103 || July 26 || @ Braves || 3–5 || Teherán (10–6) || Despaigne (2–2) || Kimbrel (31) || 33,820 || 46–57 || Box
|- style="text-align:center; bgcolor="ffbbbb"
| 104 || July 27 || @ Braves || 3–8 || Minor (4–6) || Stults (3–13) ||  || 31,456 || 46–58 || Box
|- style="text-align:center; bgcolor="ffbbbb"
| 105 || July 28 || @ Braves || 0–2 || Santana (10–6) || Lane (0–1) || Kimbrel (32) || 23,281 || 46–59 || Box
|- style="text-align:center; bgcolor="bbffbb"
| 106 || July 29 || Cardinals || 3–1 ||  Ross (10–10) || Lynn (11–8) || Benoit (3) || 33,521 || 47–59 || Box
|- style="text-align:center; bgcolor="bbffbb"
| 107 || July 30 || Cardinals || 12–1 || Hahn (7–2) || Kelly (2–2) ||  || 30,973 || 48–59 || Box
|- style="text-align:center; bgcolor="ffbbbb"
| 108 || July 31 || Cardinals || 2–6 || Miller (8–8) || Despaigne (2–3) ||  || 28,820 || 48–60 || Box
|-

|- style="text-align:center; bgcolor="bbffbb"
| 109 || August 1 || Braves || 10–1 || Stults (4–13) || Minor (4–7) ||  || 33,779 || 49–60 || Box
|- style="text-align:center; bgcolor="bbffbb"
| 110 || August 2 || Braves || 3–2 || Stauffer (3–2) || Kimbrel (0–3) ||  || 39,402 || 50–60 || Box
|- style="text-align:center; bgcolor="bbffbb"
| 111 || August 3 || Braves || 4–3 || Stauffer (4–2) || Hale (3–4) ||  || 30,861 || 51–60 || Box
|- style="text-align:center; bgcolor="ffbbbb"
| 112 || August 5 || @ Twins || 1–3 || Hughes (11–8) || Hahn (7–3) || Perkins (28) || 34,495 || 51–61 || Box
|- style="text-align:center; bgcolor="bbffbb"
| 113 || August 6 || @ Twins || 5–4 || Quackenbush (2–2) || Swarzak (2–1) || Benoit (4) || 34,567 || 52–61 || Box
|- style="text-align:center; bgcolor="ffbbbb"
| 114 || August 8 || @ Pirates || 1–2 || Worley (5–1) || Kennedy (8–10) || Melancon (21) || 38,088 || 52–62 || Box
|- style="text-align:center; bgcolor="bbffbb"
| 115 || August 9 || @ Pirates || 2–1 || Stults (5–13) || Liriano (3–8) || Benoit (5) || 38,614 || 53–62 || Box
|- style="text-align:center; bgcolor="bbffbb"
| 116 || August 10 || @ Pirates || 8–2 || Ross (11–10) || Morton (5–11) ||  || 38,030 || 54–62 || Box
|- style="text-align:center; bgcolor="bbffbb"
| 117 || August 11 || Rockies || 4–3 || Vincent (1–2) || Logan (2–3) || Benoit (6) || 28,591 || 55–62 || Box
|- style="text-align:center; bgcolor="bbffbb"
| 118 || August 12 || Rockies || 4–1 || Despaigne (3–3) || Flande (0–5) ||  || 27,188 || 56–62 || Box
|- style="text-align:center; bgcolor="bbffbb"
| 119 || August 13 || Rockies || 5–3 || Kennedy (9–10) || Matzek (2–8) || Benoit (7) || 23,902 || 57–62 || Box
|- style="text-align:center; bgcolor="ffbbbb"
| 120 || August 14 || @ Cardinals || 3–4 || Maness (4–2) || Torres (1–1) || Rosenthal (36) || 45,126 || 57–63 || Box
|- style="text-align:center; bgcolor="ffbbbb"
| 121 || August 15 || @ Cardinals || 2–4 || Lynn (13–8) || Ross (11–11) || Neshek (4) || 42,662 || 57–64 || Box
|- style="text-align:center; bgcolor="bbffbb"
| 122 || August 16 || @ Cardinals || 9–5 || Torres (2–1) || Siegrist (1–3) ||  || 44,079 || 58–64 || Box
|- style="text-align:center; bgcolor="ffbbbb"
| 123 || August 17 || @ Cardinals || 6–7 || Wainwright (15–7) || Despaigne (3–4) || Maness (2) || 43,149 || 58–65 || Box
|- style="text-align:center; bgcolor="ffbbbb"
| 124 || August 19 || @ Dodgers || 6–8 || Correia (7–13) || Kennedy (9–11) || Jansen (35) || 45,459 || 58–66 || Box
|- style="text-align:center; bgcolor="bbffbb"
| 125 || August 20 || @ Dodgers || 4–1 || Stults (6–13) || Hernández (7–9) || Quackenbush (1) || 46,641 || 59–66 || Box
|- style="text-align:center; bgcolor="ffbbbb"
| 126 || August 21 || @ Dodgers || 1–2 || Kershaw (15–3) || Ross (11–12) || Jansen (36) || 39,596 || 59–67 || Box
|- style="text-align:center; bgcolor="ffbbbb"
| 127 || August 22 || @ Diamondbacks || 1–5 || Collmenter (9–7) || Despaigne (3–5) ||  || 24,835 || 59–68 || Box
|- style="text-align:center; bgcolor="ffbbbb"
| 128 || August 23 || @ Diamondbacks || 2–5 || Pérez (3–3) || Quackenbush (2–3) || Reed (30) || 30,583 || 59–69 || Box
|- style="text-align:center; bgcolor="bbffbb"
| 129 || August 24 || @ Diamondbacks || 7–4 || Kennedy (10–11) || Anderson (7–6) || Benoit (8) || 20,852 || 60–69 || Box
|- style="text-align:center; bgcolor="ffbbbb"
| 130 || August 25 || Brewers || 1–10 || Lohse (12–7) || Stults (6–14) ||  || 24,968 || 60–70 || Box
|- style="text-align:center; bgcolor="bbffbb"
| 131 || August 26 || Brewers || 4–1 || Ross (12–12) || Nelson (2–5) || Benoit (9) || 21,786 || 61–70 || Box
|- style="text-align:center; bgcolor="bbffbb"
| 132 || August 27 || Brewers || 3–2 (10) || Thayer (4–3) || Duke (4–1) ||  || 21,156 || 62–70 || Box
|- style="text-align:center; bgcolor="bbffbb"
| 133 || August 29 || Dodgers || 3–2 || Stauffer (5–2) || Correia (7–15) ||  || 30,818 || 63–70 || Box
|- style="text-align:center; bgcolor="bbffbb"
| 134 || August 30 || Dodgers || 2–1 || Stauffer (6–2) || Wright (4–4) ||  || 43,926 || 64–70 || Box
|- style="text-align:center; bgcolor="ffbbbb"
| 135 || August 31 || Dodgers || 1–7 || Ryu (14–6) || Stults (6–15) ||  || 37,169 || 64–71 || Box
|-

|- style="text-align:center; bgcolor="bbffbb"
| 136 || September 1 || Diamondbacks || 3–1 || Ross (13–12) || Cahill (3–10) || Quackenbush (2) || 18,564 || 65–71 || Box
|- style="text-align:center; bgcolor="bbffbb"
| 137 || September 2 || Diamondbacks || 2–1 || Quackenbush (5–3) || Ziegler (5–3) ||  || 14,316 || 66–71 || Box
|- style="text-align:center; bgcolor="ffbbbb"
| 138 || September 3 || Diamondbacks || 1–6 || Collmenter (10–7) || Cashner (2–7) ||  || 16,335 || 66–72 || Box
|- style="text-align:center; bgcolor="ffbbbb"
| 139 || September 4 || Diamondbacks || 1–5 || Delgado (3–3) || Kennedy (10–12) ||  || 16,025 || 66–73 || Box
|- style="text-align:center; bgcolor="ffbbbb"
| 140 || September 5 || @ Rockies || 0–3 || Matzek (5–9) || Stults (6–16) ||  || 24,586 || 66–74 || Box
|- style="text-align:center; bgcolor="ffbbbb"
| 141 || September 6 || @ Rockies || 6–7 || Masset (2–0) || Hahn (7–4) ||  || 28,496 || 66–75 || Box
|- style="text-align:center; bgcolor="ffbbbb"
| 142 || September 7 || @ Rockies || 0–6 || Morales (6–7) || Ross (13–13) ||  || 26,102 || 66–76 || Box
|- style="text-align:center; bgcolor="ffbbbb"
| 143 || September 8 || @ Dodgers || 4–9 || Kershaw (18–3) || Despaigne (3–6) ||  || 41,886 || 66–77 || Box
|- style="text-align:center; bgcolor="bbffbb"
| 144 || September 9 || @ Dodgers || 6–3 || Cashner (3–7) || Hernández (8–11) ||  || 45,213 || 67–77 || Box
|- style="text-align:center; bgcolor="ffbbbb"
| 145 || September 10 || @ Dodgers || 0–4 || Haren (13–10) || Kennedy (10–13) ||  || 45,586 || 67–78 || Box
|- style="text-align:center; bgcolor="bbffbb"
| 146 || September 12 || @ Diamondbacks || 6–5 || Stults (7–16) || Nuño (2–11) || Quackenbush (3) || 31,238 || 68–78 || Box
|- style="text-align:center; bgcolor="ffbbbb"
| 147 || September 13 || @ Diamondbacks || 4–10 || Anderson (9–6) || Ross (13–14) ||  || 32,429 || 68–79 || Box
|- style="text-align:center; bgcolor="ffbbbb"
| 148 || September 14 || @ Diamondbacks || 6–8 || Spruill (1–1) || Despaigne (3–7) ||  || 26,075 || 68–80 || Box
|- style="text-align:center; bgcolor="bbffbb"
| 149 || September 15 || Phillies || 1–0 || Cashner (4–7) || Williams (5–7) ||  || 17,558 || 69–80 || Box
|- style="text-align:center; bgcolor="bbffbb"
| 150 || September 16 || Phillies || 5–4 || Kennedy (11–13) || Burnett (8–17) || Quackenbush (4) || 24,541 || 70–80 || Box
|- style="text-align:center; bgcolor="ffbbbb"
| 151 || September 17 || Phillies || 2–5 || Hamels (9–7) || Stults (7–17) ||  || 17,311 || 70–81 || Box
|- style="text-align:center; bgcolor="bbffbb"
| 152 || September 18 || Phillies || 7–3 || Erlin (4–4) || Kendrick (9–13) ||  || 18,076 || 71–81 || Box
|- style="text-align:center; bgcolor="bbffbb"
| 153 || September 19 || Giants || 5–0 || Despaigne (4–7) || Hudson (9–12) ||  || 34,472 || 72–81 || Box
|- style="text-align:center; bgcolor="bbffbb"
| 154 || September 20 || Giants || 2–3 || Cashner (5–7) || Petit (5–5) || Quackenbush (5) || 40,660 || 73–81 || Box
|- style="text-align:center; bgcolor="bbffbb"
| 155 || September 21 || Giants || 8–2 || Kennedy (12–13) || Vogelsong (8–12) ||  || 32,480 || 74–81 || Box
|- style="text-align:center; bgcolor="bbffbb"
| 156 || September 22 || Rockies || 1–0 || Stults (8–17) || Matzek (6–11) || Quackenbush (6) || 19,770 || 75–81 || Box
|- style="text-align:center; bgcolor="ffbbbb"
| 157 || September 23 || Rockies  || 2–3 || Nicasio (6–6) || Thayer (4–4) || Hawkins (33) || 33,669 || 75–82 || Box
|- style="text-align:center; bgcolor="bbffbb"
| 158 || September 24 || Rockies || 4–3 || Wieland (1–0) || Flande (0–6) || Benoit (10) || 38,589 || 76–82 || Box
|- style="text-align:center; bgcolor="ffbbbb"
| 159 || September 25 || @ Giants || 8–9 || Lincecum (11–9) || Boyer (0–1) || Casilla (18) || 41,850 || 76–83 || Box
|- style="text-align:center; bgcolor="bbffbb"
| 160 || September 26 || @ Giants || 4–1 || Kennedy (13–13) || Vogelsong (8–13) || Benoit (11) || 41,926 || 77–83 || Box
|- style="text-align:center; bgcolor="ffbbbb"
| 161 || September 27 || @ Giants || 1–3 || Strickland (1–0) || Thayer (4–5) || Casilla (19) || 41,157 || 77–84 || Box 
|- style="text-align:center; bgcolor="ffbbbb"
| 162 || September 28 || @ Giants || 3–9 || Lincecum (12–9) || Erlin (4–5) ||  || 41,077 || 77–85 || Box
|-

Roster

Farm system

References

External links
San Diego Padres official site
2014 San Diego Padres at baseball-reference.com

San Diego Padres seasons
San Diego Padres
San Diego Padres